The 1993 Indonesia Open in badminton was held in Jakarta, from July 21 to July 25, 1993. It was a five-star tournament and the prize money was US$166,000.

Venue
Istora Senayan

Final results

External links
Smash: 1993 Indonesian Open

Indonesia Open (badminton)
Indonesia
1993 in Indonesian sport
Sports competitions in Jakarta